Uğur Köken (born November 28, 1937) is the former left wide midfielder of Galatasaray. He played at Galatasaray between 1955 and 1973 and was capped 12 times for Turkey, He competed in the men's tournament at the 1960 Summer Olympics.

Honours

As player
Galatasaray
 Süper Lig: 6
1961-1962, 1962–1963, 1968–1969, 1970–1971, 1971–1972, 1972–1973
 Turkish Cup: 5
1962-1963, 1963–1964, 1964–1965, 1965–1966, 1972–1973
 Süper Kupa: 3
1966, 1969, 1972
 TSYD Kupası: 4
1963, 1966, 1967, 1970

See also
List of one-club men
List of Turkish football champions
Football records in Turkey

References

1937 births
Living people
Galatasaray High School alumni
Turkish footballers
Galatasaray S.K. footballers
Turkey international footballers
Süper Lig players
Olympic footballers of Turkey
Footballers at the 1960 Summer Olympics
Association football midfielders